The College of Veterinary Sciences & Animal Husbandry, one of the constituent colleges of the Central Agricultural University, was established through the promulgation of an ordinance (No. M-2 of 1995, dated 20 February) and became functional with the admission of first batch of students to BVSc & AH degree course in the 1997. It is near Aizawl in the state of Mizoram. Lalnuntluangi Hmar is the dean of the college. 

 The college took part in a CAU-organised North-East Agri Fair 2007–2008, and in a national seminar on "Integrated Farming System relevant to North-East region" in February 2008. The Department of Animal Reproduction, Gynaecology & Obstetrics of the College organised XXVII Annual Conference of ISSAR from 27 September 2011.

Location 

The college is in Selesih, North Aizawl, about 12 km from Aizawl, the capital city of Mizoram, on the Aizawl-Sihphir-Silchar sub-highway. It has students from the North Eastern Hill States including Sikkim, Arunachal Pradesh, Meghalaya, Mizoram, Tripura and Manipur.

Departments 

As per the Veterinary Council of India's Minimum Standards for Veterinary Education (five-year BVSc & AH degree course) Regulations 2008 (implemented from the academic session 2009–10), the college has the following 17 teaching departments:

Veterinary Physiology & Biochemistry 
Veterinary Anatomy & Histology
Animal Nutrition
Livestock Production & Management
Livestock Products Technology 
Animal Breeding & Genetics
Veterinary Pathology
Veterinary Microbiology
Veterinary Parasitology
Veterinary Pharmacology & Toxicology
Veterinary Public Health & Epidemiology 
Veterinary Medicine 
Veterinary Surgery & Radiology Animal Reproduction, Gynecology & Obstetrics 
Veterinary & Animal Husbandry Extension 
Teaching Veterinary Clinical Service Complex (TVCC)
Instructional Livestock Farm Complex

Academic programmes

Undergraduate programmes 

The College of Veterinary Sciences & Animal Husbandry, Central Agricultural University, Selesih has offered the degree course of Bachelor of Veterinary Science & Animal Husbandry (BVSc & AH) since its inception. The college is fully adopting the Veterinary Council of India’s Minimum Standards for Veterinary Education (five-years BVSc & AH degree course) Regulations-2008 with effect from the academic session 2009–10. The BVSc & AH degree programme is spread over 10 semesters covering 177 credit hours including six-month internship programmes.

At present, the total intake capacity is 67 students. However, the intake capacity may be increased further with the implementation of 27% reservation for OBC students.

Postgraduate programmes 

The Academic Council and the Board of Management of Central Agricultural University, Imphal approved the introduction of post-graduate (two-year MVSc degree) programmes under semester system of education in the Faculty of Veterinary Sciences & Animal Husbandry from the academic session 2006–07 in three selected disciplines: Veterinary Pharmacology & Toxicology, Veterinary Surgery & Radiology and Livestock Production & Management with an intake capacity of three students in each discipline.

The first batch of post-graduate MVSc students were admitted from second semester of academic session 2006–07. From the academic session 2007–08, MVSc programmes in three more disciplines; Veterinary Clinical Medicine, Animal Nutrition and Veterinary Microbiology were introduced.

Currently (1011–12), the college is offering MVSc degree programme in 11 disciplines and PhD programmes in three disciplines.

MVSc degree programmes:

 Veterinary Pharmacology & Toxicology
 Veterinary Surgery & Radiology 
 Livestock Production & Management 
 Veterinary Medicine
 Animal Nutrition 
 Veterinary Microbiology
 Veterinary Biochemistry
 Veterinary Gynaecology & Obstetrics
 Veterinary Pathology
 Animal Genetics & Breeding
 Livestock Products Technology 
 Livestock Product Technology

PhD programmes:

 Veterinary Microbiology
 Animal Nutrition 
 Veterinary Pharmacology & Toxicology

See also
 List of schools of veterinary medicine

References

External links 
 

Universities and colleges in Mizoram
Education in Aizawl
Veterinary schools in India